The National Broadcasting of Guinea-Bissau (RDN; in Portuguese: Radiodifusão Nacional da Guiné-Bissau), also known only as National Radio (in Portuguese: Rádio Nacional), is a public broadcasting company in Guinea-Bissau, whose head office is located in Bissau.

The RDN operates three radio stations in the country - Bissau (in city suburb of Nhacra), Catió and Gabu -, in addition to several regional stations and an international broadcast service. A network of transmitters allows the radio to cover about 80% of the country, in frequency modulation (91.5 / 104.0 FM).

The broadcasts are made mostly in Portuguese, and also have programs in the national languages of the country, namely: Creole, Fula, Balanta, Susso, Mankanya, Papel, Bijago, Felupe, Mandinka, Manjak, Beafada, Balanta Mané, Pajadinka and Nalu.

Historic
The current RDN arose from the merger of two important broadcasting services that were installed in Guinea-Bissau still in the colonial period, which operated with clearly divergent objectives. The oldest was the public state broadcaster, called the "Official Broadcaster of Portuguese Guinea", started in 1944, and; the other broadcasting service was called "Radio Liberation", started in 1964 on the initiative of nationalist activists who were fighting for the independence of Guinea-Bissau.

The unification of services would only occur in post-independence, on September 10, 1974.

See also
 Guinea-Bissau Television

References

External links

Publicly funded broadcasters
Radio stations in Guinea-Bissau
Portuguese-language radio stations
Radio stations established in 1974